CEN/TC 125 (CEN Technical Committee 125) is a technical decision making body within the CEN system working on standardization in the field of Masonry, including natural stone, in the European Union.

External links
 CEN/TC 125

Masonry
Building materials
Construction standards
Building engineering
EN standards
CEN technical committees